Marcin Kuś (born 2 September 1981) is a Polish former professional footballer (defender).

Current club
Kuś previously played for Korona Kielce, after joining on a free transfer from FC Torpedo Moscow in February 2007. In the 2005/2006 season, Kus spent the second half of the season on loan to the English Coca Cola Championship side Queens Park Rangers, making only 3 appearances.

In July 2008, he joined Turkish Süper Lig side İstanbul Büyükşehir Belediyespor, with whom he played for four years.

International career
Kuś has made seven appearances for the full Poland national football team.

References

External links
 
 
 National team stats on pzpn.pl 
 

1981 births
Living people
Polish footballers
Poland international footballers
Korona Kielce players
FC Torpedo Moscow players
Queens Park Rangers F.C. players
Lech Poznań players
Polonia Warsaw players
İstanbul Başakşehir F.K. players
Górnik Zabrze players
Ekstraklasa players
Russian Premier League players
Süper Lig players
Polish expatriate footballers
Expatriate footballers in England
Expatriate footballers in Russia
Expatriate footballers in Turkey
Footballers from Warsaw
Polish expatriate sportspeople in Turkey
Association football defenders